Lal Pur is a district in eastern Nangarhar Province, Afghanistan, bordering Pakistan. Its population is primarily Pashtun and estimated to be 34,516 in 2002 (including 13,800 children under 12). The district center is the village of Lal Pur.

Lal Pur is home to many Afghan statesmen of the past century. The Khan of Lalpur Momands, is a well-known family from Lal Pur. 
"Khan kor" ( Royal Family of khan), are among the most powerful Mohmand's. The Khan was regarded as the king of Momands by many famous Afghans such as Amir Sher Ali Khan of Afghanistan. Khan had Khani over all the Momand's and continues to have influence over Lal Pur. Most influential of them is the Khan Tahir Zaman khan, Zaman family and still having khani over lalpura.
Lal Pur was a famous trade route. The Khan would collect taxes from the traders. Lal Pur was considered a kingdom. 

Saadat khan Mohmand of Lal Pur was the father-in-law of Amir of Afghanistan and was the grandfather of the famous Amir Ayub Khan of Afghanistan, also known as "The Victor of Maiwand" or "The Afghan Prince Charlie".

The Khan of Lalpur rule was from Lal Pur, Afghanistan to Peshawar, Pakistan.

The Marchakhel was the chief of Momands and had influence over all Momand tribes except the Safi Momand which were under the influence of khan of Bajawar. Marchakhels ruled over all Momands. Marchakhels rule was from Lal Pur, Afghanistan to Peshawar, Pakistan. The Marchakhel family, a sub-tribe of the Tarak Zai Mohmands (Dado khel), is a well-known family from Lal Pur. "Khan kor" ( Royal Family of khan), a sub-tribe of the Marchakhel Mohmands, are among the most powerful Mohmands. The Khan was regarded as the king of Mohmands by many famous Afghans such as Amir Sher Ali Khan of Afghanistan. Khan had Khani over all the Mohmands and continues to have influence over Lal Pur. Most Murchakhel now live in Pakistan. Most influential members of the Royal family of Lalpura are Khan Tahir Zaman Mohmand , Khan Asad Zaman Mohmand, Dost Muhammad Khan,Gohar Zaman Mohmand and Latif Jan In Michanai area Sardar Khan family residing in riverbank of Kabul, Mughal Khan family residing in Union Council Jogani, presently leading Morcha Khel family in Jogani and Michanai areas Nayyer Aman Khan, Inayat Khan Morcha Khel, Nazar Muhammad, Samb Ali Khan, Qaiser Khan etc.

References

 UNHCR District Profile, dated 2002-07-02, accessed 2006-07-20 (PDF).

External links

 Map of Lal Pur district (PDF)
 Google Map of Lal Pur district

Districts of Nangarhar Province